Nangila Naomi van Eyck (born 13 July 1984) is a Dutch retired football striker who last played in the 2. Bundesliga for SV Meppen.

Club career
At the age of 14, she started playing for SV DWO in Zoetermeer, then for KFC '71 before playing for SV Saestum of the Hoofdklasse, the highest Dutch league at the time. When the national professional league (Eredivisie) was established in 2007, she joined ADO Den Haag and later SC Heerenveen. During her time at Saestum and ADO she also participated in the UEFA European Cup / Champions League.

In 2012 she joined German 2. Bundesliga club SV Meppen, scoring a total of 40 goals in 60 matches (league and cup combined) until 2015.

International career
She was also a member of the Netherlands national team. She made her debut on 16 February 2005 against Spain and played 37 matches for the national team, her last on 9 February 2013 against Belgium.

International goals
Scores and results list the Netherlands goal tally first.

* Note: Match not considered as an official friendly.

References

External links
 

1984 births
Living people
Footballers from Dordrecht
Women's association football forwards
Dutch sportspeople of Surinamese descent
Dutch women's footballers
Netherlands women's international footballers
SC Heerenveen (women) players
ADO Den Haag (women) players
Eredivisie (women) players
Expatriate women's footballers in Germany
Dutch expatriate sportspeople in Germany
Dutch expatriate women's footballers
SV Saestum players